Larry Horaeb (born 12 November 1991) is a Namibian international footballer who plays as a right back.

Career
Horaeb has played for SK Windhoek, Ramblers and AmaZulu.

He made his international debut for Namibia in 2011.

References

1991 births
Living people
Namibian men's footballers
Namibia international footballers
SK Windhoek players
Ramblers F.C. players
AmaZulu F.C. players
South African Premier Division players
Association football fullbacks
Namibian expatriate footballers
Namibian expatriate sportspeople in South Africa
Expatriate soccer players in South Africa
2019 Africa Cup of Nations players
People from Otjozondjupa Region